Machinga may refer to:

 Machinga people
 Machinga language
 Machinga District, in the Southern Region of Malawi